Monogram Biosciences Inc. (formerly ViroLogic Inc.), a wholly owned subsidiary of LabCorp, is an international biotechnology laboratory located in South San Francisco, California, USA.  Monogram develops and markets assays to help guide and improve the treatment of infectious diseases (including HIV and Hepatitis) and cancer.

Virologic was founded in 1996 by Daniel Capon, Ph.D., Martin Goldstein and Robert S. Capon. The company went public (NASDAQ: VLGC) in 2000.

Monogram was acquired by Laboratory Corporation of America in June 2009.

References

External links 
 
 Baseline HIV Type 1 Coreceptor Tropism Predicts Disease Progression 
 Four Studies Affirm Significance Of Monogram's Trofile(TM) HIV Co-Receptor Tropism Assay 
  Accuracy of Monogram's Trofile Assay in Determining Tropism and New Tropism Assays in Development 
 Trofile Bests SensiTrop as Most Reliable Tropism Test 
 Monogram Biosciences teams up with Pfizer for HIV treatment 
 Monogram Biosciences Launches New "Trofile" HIV Co-receptor Tropism Test to Select Patients Eligible to User CCR5 Antagonist Maraviroc (Selzentry) 

Biotechnology companies of the United States
Biotechnology companies established in 1996
Health care companies based in California
Companies formerly listed on the Nasdaq
Companies based in San Mateo County, California
South San Francisco, California 
2000 initial public offerings
2009 mergers and acquisitions